Rybička may refer to:

 Rybička (knife), a Czech pocket knife
 Petr Rybička (born 1996), Czech footballer

See also
 
 Rybicki

Czech-language surnames